Deslinières is a French surname. Notable people with the surname include:

Léon Deslinières, French rower and Olympian
Lucien Deslinières (1857–1937), French journalist, writer and socialist

French-language surnames